Enes Başar (born 30 April 1993) is a Turkish Greco-Roman wrestler. He won one of the bronze medals in the 67 kg event at the 2018 European Wrestling Championships held in Kaspiysk, Russia.

Career 

In 2019, he represented Turkey at the European Games held in Minsk, Belarus in the 67 kg event without winning a medal. In 2020, he competed in the 67 kg event at the European Wrestling Championships held in Rome, Italy, also without winning a medal.

Major results

References

External links 
 

Living people
1993 births
Place of birth missing (living people)
Turkish male sport wrestlers
European Games competitors for Turkey
Wrestlers at the 2019 European Games
European Wrestling Championships medalists
20th-century Turkish people
21st-century Turkish people